Franklin Justice Oliver (born March 3, 1952 in Wetumpka, Alabama) is a former National Football League defensive back who played from 1975 to 1976 for the Buffalo Bills and Tampa Bay Buccaneers. He attended St. Jude High School and then Kentucky State University before being drafted by the San Francisco 49ers in the 4th round, 87th overall, in the 1975 NFL Draft.

References

Living people
1952 births
Buffalo Bills players
Tampa Bay Buccaneers players
Kentucky State Thorobreds football players
American football defensive backs
People from Wetumpka, Alabama
Players of American football from Alabama